Centrorhynchidae is a family of parasitic worms. Three species of these thorny-headed worms in the genus Centrorhynchus were found to parasitize birds of prey and owls Slovakia. These hosts include Buteo buteo, Buteo rufinus, Falco tinnunculus, Asio otus, Strix aluco, Strix uralensis and Tyto alba.

Species
Centrorhynchidae contains the following species:

Centrorhynchus Lühe, 1911
 Centrorhynchus acanthotrias (von Linstow, 1883)	
 Centrorhynchus albensis Rengaraju and Das, 1975
 Centrorhynchus albidus Meyer, 1932
 Centrorhynchus aluconis (Mueller, 1780)

The complete mitochondrial genome of C. aluconis has been sequenced.

 Centrorhynchus amini Khan, Muti-ur-Rahman, Bilqees and Khatoon, 2010	
 Centrorhynchus amphibius Das, 1950
 Centrorhynchus appendiculatus (Westrumb, 1821)
 Centrorhynchus asturinus (Johnston, 1912)
 Centrorhynchus atheni Gupta and Fatma, 1983
 Centrorhynchus bancrofti (Johnston and Best, 1943)
 Centrorhynchus bazaleticus Kuraschvili, 1955	
 Centrorhynchus bengalensis Datta and Soota, 1954
 Centrorhynchus bethaniae George and Nadakal, 1987
 Centrorhynchus bilqeesae Ghazi, Khan and Noorun-Nisa, 2005
 Centrorhynchus brama Rengaraju and Das, 1980
 Centrorhynchus brevicaudatus Das, 1949
 Centrorhynchus brumpti Golvan, 1965
 Centrorhynchus brygooi Golvan, 1965
 Centrorhynchus bubonis Yamaguti, 1939
 Centrorhynchus buckleyi Gupta and Fatma, 1983
 Centrorhynchus buteonis (Schrank, 1788)
 Centrorhynchus californicus Millzner, 1924
 Centrorhynchus chabaudi Golvan, 1958
 Centrorhynchus clitorideus (Meyer, 1931)
 Centrorhynchus conspectus Van Cleave and Pratt, 1940 
 Centrorhynchus crotophagicola Schmidt and Neiland, 1966 
 Centrorhynchus dimorphocephalus (Westrumb, 1821)
 Centrorhynchus dipsadis (Linstow, 1888)
 Centrorhynchus elongatus Yamaguti, 1935
 Centrorhynchus falconis (Johnston and Best, 1943) 
 Centrorhynchus fasciatus (Westrumb, 1821)
 Centrorhynchus fisheri Bhattacharya, 1999
 Centrorhynchus freundi (Hartwick, 1953)
 Centrorhynchus fukiensis Wang, 1966
 Centrorhynchus galliardi Golvan, 1956
 Centrorhynchus gendrei (Golvan, 1957)
 Centrorhynchus gibsoni Khan, Ghazi and Bilqees, 2002
 Centrorhynchus giganteus Travassos, 1921
 Centrorhynchus glaucidii Wang, 1966
 Centrorhynchus globocaudatus (Zeder, 1800) 
 Centrorhynchus golvani Anantaraman, et al., 1969
 Centrorhynchus grassei Golvan, 1965
 Centrorhynchus guira Lunaschi and Drago, 2010
 Centrorhynchus guptai Golvan, 1969
 Centrorhynchus hagiangensis (Petrochenko and Fan, 1969)
 Centrorhynchus halcyonicola Smales, 2011
 Centrorhynchus hartwichi Golvan, 1994
 Centrorhynchus horridus (Linstow, 1897)
 Centrorhynchus indicus Golvan, 1956
 Centrorhynchus insularis Tubangui, 1833
 Centrorhynchus itatsinsis Fukui, 1929
 Centrorhynchus javanicans Rengaraju and Das, 1975 
 Centrorhynchus knowlesi Datta and Soota, 1955
 Centrorhynchus kuntzi Schmidt and Neiland, 1966
 Centrorhynchus latai Golvan, 1994
 Centrorhynchus leptorhynchus Meyer, 1932
 Centrorhynchus longicephalus Das, 1950
 Centrorhynchus lucknowensis Gupta and Fatma, 1983 
 Centrorhynchus mabuiae (Linstow, 1908)
 Centrorhynchus macrorchis Das, 1949
 Centrorhynchus madagascariensis (Golvan, 1957) 
 Centrorhynchus magnus Fukui, 1929
 Centrorhynchus mariauxi Smales, 2011
 Centrorhynchus merulae Dolfus and Golvan, 1961 
 Centrorhynchus microcephalus (Bravo-hollis, 1947)
 Centrorhynchus migrans Zuberi and Faroog, 1974
 Centrorhynchus milvus Ward, 1956
 Centrorhynchus mysentri Gupta and Fatma, 1983 
 Centrorhynchus nahuelhuapensis Steinauer, Flores and Rauque, 2020

C. nahuelhuapensis was found in the intestine of the rufous-legged owl (Strix rufipes) in Patagonia, Argentina. The proboscis is armed with 31–33 rows of hooks 16 or 17 hooks per row. The hooks in each row are distributed into 5 true hooks, 4 transitional hooks, and 7–8 spiniform hooks. It has three cement glands. The worm has a filiform body. Phylogenetic analysis was conducted using the small and large ribosomal subunits confirming the placement of this species in the genus Centrorhynchus.

 Centrorhynchus narcissae Florescu, 1942
 Centrorhynchus nicaraguensis Schmidt and Neiland, 1966
 Centrorhynchus nickoli Khan, Bilqees and Ghazi, 2001
 Centrorhynchus ninni (Stossich, 1891)
 Centrorhynchus owli Bhattacharya, 1999
 Centrorhynchus paramaryasis Amin, 2013
 Centrorhynchus petrochenkoi Kuraschvilli, 1955 
 Centrorhynchus polemaeti Troncy, 1970
 Centrorhynchus ptyasus Gupta, 1950
 Centrorhynchus pycnonoti Wang, 1986
 Centrorhynchus renardi (Lindemann, 1865)
 Centrorhynchus robustus Richardson and Nickol, 1995
 Centrorhynchus sharmai Gupta and Lata, 1966
 Centrorhynchus sholapurensis Rengaraju and Das, 1975
 Centrorhynchus sikkimensis Bhattacharya, 2003
 Centrorhynchus simplex Meyer, 1932
 Centrorhynchus sindhensis Khan, Khatoon and Bilqees, 2002
 Centrorhynchus sinicus Wang, 1966
 Centrorhynchus smyrnensis Bhattacharya, 2007
 Centrorhynchus spilornae Schmidt and Kuntz, 1969 
 Centrorhynchus spinosus (Kaiser, 1893)
 Centrorhynchus tumidulus (Rudolphi, 1819)
 Centrorhynchus tyotensis Rengaraju and Das, 1975
 Centrorhynchus undulatus Dollfus, 1951
Neolacunisoma Amin and Canaris, 1997
Neolacunisoma geraldschmidti Amin and Canaris, 1997
Sphaerirostris Golvan, 1956
 Sphaerirostris areolatus (Rudolphi, 1819)
 Sphaerirostris batrachus (Das, 1952)
 Sphaerirostris bipartitus (Soloviev, 1912)
 Sphaerirostris cinctus (Rudolphi, 1819)
 Sphaerirostris corvi (Fukui, 1929)
 Sphaerirostris dollfusi Golvan, 1994
 Sphaerirostris embae (Cholodkowski and Kostylew, 1916)
 Sphaerirostris erraticus (Chandler, 1925)
 Sphaerirostris globuli (Nama and Rathore, 1984)
 Sphaerirostris lancea (Westrumb, 1821)
 Sphaerirostris lanceoides (Petrochenko, 1949)
 Sphaerirostris leguminosus (Soloviev, 1912)
 Sphaerirostris lesiniformis (Molin, 1859)
 Sphaerirostris maryasis (Datta, 1932)
 Sphaerirostris opimus (Travassos, 1919) 
 Sphaerirostris physocoracis (Porta, 1913)
 Sphaerirostris picae (Rudolphi, 1819)
 Sphaerirostris pinguis (Van Cleave, 1918)
 Sphaerirostris reptans (Bhalerao, 1931)
 Sphaerirostris robustus (Datta, 1928)
 Sphaerirostris saxicoloides (Nama and Rathore, 1984)
 Sphaerirostris scanensis (Lundström, 1942)
 Sphaerirostris serpenticola (Linstow, 1908)
 Sphaerirostris skrjabini (Petrochenko, 1949)
 Sphaerirostris tenuicaudatus (Marotel, 1889)
 Sphaerirostris turdi (Yamaguti, 1939)
 Sphaerirostris wertheimae Schmidt, 1975

Notes

References

Polymorphida
Acanthocephala families